Avraham "Avi" Lanir (January 25, 1940 – October 1973) was a lieutenant colonel in the Israel Air Force. He was the highest-ranking Israeli fighter pilot to fall into enemy hands.

Biography
Avraham Lankin (later Lanir) was born in 1940 in Herzliya. His parents Yaacov and Malka were active members in the British Mandate era militant group Etzel.  His father went on to become a senior member of the Shin Bet. His uncle, Eliyahu Lankin, was the commander of the weapons ship Altelena. Lanir studied at several schools, with the family following his father's employment relocations throughout Israel. In 1954, the family moved to Washington, D.C. in the framework of Lanir’s father’s work in the service of the state of Israel. When Avi Lanir was 17, he returned to Israel with his family and for the year which remained before his enlistment he studied electronics at the Israeli Air Force’s technical academy. In August 1962, Lanir married Michal Barzilai. The couple had two children, Noam and Nurit.

Air force career
Lanir enlisted in the Israel Defense Forces in 1959, training to become a fighter pilot. He flew the Dassault Mirage III with 117 Squadron and on April 6, 1967, scored his first aerial kill in a major skirmish along the Syrian border which ended with the downing of six Syrian jets. Lanir, flying Mirage 60, downed a SAF MiG-21 with cannon fire after closing in to a distance of 200 meters. The MiG exploded and Lanir flew right through the fireball, covering his aircraft with soot. Initially blinded, enough soot was eventually blown off his canopy to afford Lanir a safe landing at Ramat David. The scorched aircraft earned the nickname "Black Mirage", and Lanir flew it once again during Operation Focus on June 5, 1967, when he participated in a strike against the Egyptian air base at Fayid. The aircraft was lost 2 days later over Iraq.

After the Six-Day War Lanir converted to the Dassault Super Mystere which he flew as the senior deputy commander of 105 Squadron during the War of Attrition.

In 1965 Lanir was sent to study electrical engineering at the Technion – Israel Institute of Technology, from which he graduated in 1969. He was thereafter appointed to test pilot the "Technolog," the prototype that preceded the IAI Kfir.

In 1971, Lanir was assigned command of 101 Squadron, operating the Dassault Mirage out of Hazor. He scored his second aerial kill on November 9, 1972, downing a Syrian MiG-21 while flying Mirage 72. On October 12, 1973, a week after the Yom Kippur War began, Lanir scored his third and last aerial kill, downing a Syrian MiG-17 in the vicinity of Kuneitra while flying Mirage 58.

Capture and death
On October 13, 1973, Lanir was scrambled for a reconnaissance mission deep in Syrian territory. Lanir was not aware of the location of the mobile missile batteries that the Syrians had placed overnight, possibly due to not attending the morning squadron briefing. During his return to Israel, Lanir was caught in a missile ambush and his Mirage was hit in the rear, forcing him to eject. The wind carried the parachuting pilot back over the border into Syrian territory and he landed in the area of Mazra'at Beit Jinn. Israeli Armor Corps soldiers witnessed him land and attempted to rescue him, but he was captured by a Syrian jeep patrol that reached him first.

Foreign press reports claimed that Lanir had information on Israel's nuclear program. According to Yuval Neeman, then Prime Minister Golda Meir delivered a message to Henry Kissinger stating that the Israeli government would be willing to relinquish the Hermon peak in return for the 28 Israeli pilots, including Lanir, held captive by the Syrians. However, Lanir was tortured to death by his interrogators.

On June 6, 1974, the Syrians returned Lanir's body. Former Israel Air Force Commander Mordechai Hod noted that Lanir had information that would have placed the existence of Israel at risk had he revealed it to the Syrians.

Awards
 1976: Medal of Courage (awarded posthumously)

References

Bibliography
 
 
 

1940 births
1973 deaths
Israeli Air Force personnel
20th-century Israeli Jews
Israeli military personnel killed in action
Israeli military casualties of Yom Kippur War
Israeli people of the Yom Kippur War
Torture in Syria
Israeli torture victims
Yom Kippur War pilots
Shot-down aviators
Israeli prisoners of war
Prisoners of war held by Syria
Murders of IDF soldiers